is a Japanese actor and voice actor from Aichi Prefecture. He is affiliated with Haikyō. He is best known for his voice role as Warrior on Goblin Slayer. On April 9, 2021, Takumi announced he married voice actor Aki Nakajima.

Filmography

Anime television

Nogizaka Haruka no Himitsu (2008), Amateur photographer D
Bleach (2009), Shinigami
K-On! (2009), Garbage collection voice
Bakugan Battle Brawlers: New Vestroia (2009), Ace Grit
Kimi ni Todoke (2009), Shin Mikami
Durarara!! (2010), Blue Square D, Boy
K-ON! Season 2 (2010), Man
Shiki (2010), Masaki Tashiro, Tamotsu Mutō, Tsurumi
Star Driver (2010), Classmate
Kimi ni Todoke 2nd Season (2011), Tomokazu Tsuruoka, Shin Mikami
Hanasaku Iroha (2011), Student
Sket Dance (2011), Delinquent C, Film Society member
Yu-Gi-Oh! Zexal (2011), Fallguys Coyote, Taiichi (classmate)
Moshidora (2011), Daisuke Niimi
Ro-Kyu-Bu! (2011), Upperclassman
The Idolmaster (2011), Cameraman, MC B
Battle Spirits: Heroes (2011), Ryūta Furuya
Persona 4: The Animation (2011), Minoru Inoue
Last Exile: Fam, The Silver Wing (2011), Reporting soldier, Superior officer
Ben-To (2011), Club member A, Shōbenkosō, Wolf A, Wolf B
High School DxD (2012), Matsuda
The Familiar of Zero F (2012), Ari
Lagrange: The Flower of Rin-ne (2012), Aran Wan, Noboru Minamizawa, Raito Egami, Shigeki Hamamoto, Torichery
Waiting in the Summer (2012), Schoolboy C, Student A
Lagrange: The Flower of Rin-ne (2012), Aran Wan, Cero, Crimale, Ijimi Yoshimasu, Nakaya Tsurumoto
Cross Fight B-Daman eS (2012), Kamon Godai
Yu-Gi-Oh! Zexal II (2012), Taichi
Zettai Karen Children (2013), Announcer
The Severing Crime Edge (2013), Newscaster
Devil Survivor 2: The Animation (2013), Civilian A
High School DxD New (2013), Matsuda
Recently, My Sister Is Unusual (2014), Shōtarō Torii
Yu-Gi-Oh! Arc-V (2014), Michio Mokota
Jinsei (2014), Yūki Akamatsu
Lord Marksman and Vanadis (2014), Olivier
Yatterman Night (2015), Yatter Soldier A
High School DxD BorN (2015), Matsuda
Plastic Memories (2015), Tsukasa Mizugaki
Charlotte (2015), Gondō
Snow White with the Red Hair (2015), Shikito
Seiyu's Life! (2015), Mixer
Mobile Suit Gundam: Iron-Blooded Orphans (2015), Akihiro Altland
Momokuri (2016), Ema Sawaguchi
Nurse Witch Komugi R (2016), Hiroto Tachibana
Beyblade Burst (2016), Hanami, Señor Hanami, Gunta Hanami, Anami Unta
 Mahojin Guru Guru (2017), Yanban (ep. 7)
 Gamers! (2017), Gakuto Kase
 Knight's & Magic (2017), Edgar C. Blanche
 Golden Kamuy (2018), Toraji
 Zoids Wild (2018), Zodars (ep. 1 - 2)
 That Time I Got Reincarnated as a Slime (2018), Karion
 Goblin Slayer (2018), Warrior
 Requiem of the Rose King (2022), George, Duke of Clarence

ONAs
Tawawa on Monday (2016), Senior
The Way of the Househusband (2021), Yuzuru (ep. 9)

OVAs
Rinne no Lagrange: Kamogawa Days (2012), Tadashi Kamidake
High School DxD (2012), Matsuda
Paradise of Innocence (2014), Shōta
Recently, My Sister Is Unusual (2014), Shōtarō Torii

Anime Films
Hiyokoi (2010), Hiiragi
009 Re:Cyborg (2012), Non-Com

Tokusatsu
Jyuken Sentai Gekiranger (2007), Confrontation Beast-Ostrich Fist Chouda (ep. 29 - 30)
Engine Sentai Go-onger (2008), Savage Water Barbaric Machine Beast Hikigane Banki (ep. 13)
Samurai Sentai Shinkenger Returns (2010), Chairman
Kaizoku Sentai Gokaiger (2011), Non-commissioned Officers Sugormin (ep. 10 (Voiced by Yoshimitsu Shimoyama (ep. 1), Kenichirou Matsuda (ep. 10), Kensuke Tamura (ep. 12), Ibuki (ep. 34)))

Video games
MapleStory (2013), Zero (Alpha)
Final Fantasy XIV: Heavensward (2015), Zephirin
Fire Emblem Fates (2015), Shiro
Yume Oukoku To Nemureru 100-nin No Ouji-sama (2015), Prytwen
Need for Speed Payback (2017), Tyler Morgan
For Whom the Alchemist Exists (2016), Magnus
Plastic Memories (2016)

Animation Dubbing
Wander Over Yonder (2014), Wander

References

External links 
 Official blog 
 Official agency profile 
 
 

1982 births
Living people
Male voice actors from Aichi Prefecture
Japanese male musical theatre actors
Japanese male video game actors
Japanese male voice actors
21st-century Japanese male actors
Tokyo Actor's Consumer's Cooperative Society voice actors